The Senate of Finland combined the functions of cabinet and supreme court in the Grand Duchy of Finland from 1816 to 1917 and in the independent Finland from 1917 to 1918.

The body that would become the Senate was established on August 18, 1809, when Tsar Alexander I of Russia summoned the Diet of Porvoo and directed the Diet to draw up regulations for a Government Council. In 1816, Alexander renamed this body the Senate to demonstrate that it was equal to rather than inferior to its Russian equivalent.

The Senate was headed by the Governor-General of Finland. The members of the Senate had to be Finnish citizens. The Senate was divided into the economic division and the judicial division. In 1822 both divisions were given a Finnish vice-chairman. From 1858 and onwards the members of the senate were formally known as senators. After the February Revolution in Russia the Vice Chairman of the Economic Division became the Chairman of the Senate. Due to the Civil War in 1918 the Senate was relocated to the town of Vaasa from January 29 to May 3.

In 1918 the economic division became the Cabinet and the judicial division became the Supreme Court and the Supreme Administrative Court of the independent Finland. The vice chairman of the economic division became the Prime Minister of Finland, and the other senators became ministers. Finland became a republic in 1919.

Vice Chairman of the Economic Division (1822–1917) 

Carl Erik Mannerheim, (1822–1826)
 (acting), (1826–1828)
Anders Henrik Falck, (1828–1833)
, (1833–1841)
Lars Gabriel von Haartman, (1841–1858)
, (1858–1882)
, (1882–1885)
, (1885–1891)
, (1891–1900)
, (1900–1905)
, (1905)
Leopold Henrik Stanislaus Mechelin, (1905–1908)
Edvard Immanuel Hjelt, (1908–1909)
August Johannes Hjelt, (1909)
Anders Wirenius, (1909)
Vladimir Ivanovich Markov, (1909–1913)
Mikhail Borovitinov, (1913–1917)
Anders Wirenius (acting),  (1917)

Chairmen of the Senate (1917–1918) 
Antti Oskari Tokoi, Social Democratic Party (1917)
Eemil Nestor Setälä, Young Finnish Party (1917)
Pehr Evind Svinhufvud, Young Finnish Party (1917–1918)
Juho Kusti Paasikivi, Finnish Party (1918)

See also 
Diet of Finland
Governor-General of Finland
List of prime ministers of Finland

References

Political history of Finland
1816 establishments in Finland
Grand Duchy of Finland
'
1918 disestablishments in Finland

ru:Сенат Финляндии#Императорский финляндский сенат